Dolichoderus australis is a species of ant in the genus Dolichoderus. Described by André in 1896, the species is endemic to Australia, where it is commonly found in wet forested areas in the southern regions of the country.

References

Dolichoderus
Hymenoptera of Australia
Insects described in 1896